Kózki  in Polish and Koske in German, is a village in the administrative district of Gmina Pawłowiczki, within Kędzierzyn-Koźle County, Opole Voivodeship, in south-western Poland.

(see Territorial changes of Poland after World War II).

Popular Media
The village of Kozki was the fictional setting for the 2010 film, The Shrine, though it was actually filmed in multiple locations in Ontario, Canada.

References

Villages in Kędzierzyn-Koźle County